Enzo Agustín Martínez Beltrán (born September 29, 1990) is a Uruguayan footballer who currently plays for Birmingham Legion in the USL Championship.

Career

Youth and college
Martínez grew up in Rock Hill, South Carolina where he starred for Discoveries Soccer Club and Northwestern High School, winning a national championship at both levels. ESPN later named Martínez as the ESPN Rise High School Boys' Soccer Player of the Decade after finishing his career with three state championships, one FAB 50 national title and 182 goals.

He then played for the North Carolina Tar Heels, appearing in 72 matches and scoring 22 goals.

Professional
On January 12, 2012, Martínez was selected 17th overall by Real Salt Lake in the first round of the 2012 MLS SuperDraft.

After not seeing any playing time in 2012, Martínez was sent on a short-term loan to NASL club Carolina RailHawks on April 30, 2013.  Four days later, he made his debut for the RailHawks and netted the equalizing goal in the club's 2-2 draw on the road at Minnesota United FC.

Martínez was not retained by Real Salt Lake after the season and rejoined Carolina on a permanent basis.

Martínez signed with Charlotte Independence of the United Soccer League in March 2015.

On February 19, 2018, Martínez returned to MLS when he signed with Colorado Rapids. The Rapids sent a fourth-round pick in the 2021 MLS SuperDraft to acquire his rights from Real Salt Lake. Martínez was released by Colorado at the end of their 2018 season.

Martínez moved to USL Championship side Birmingham Legion on January 7, 2022.

Honors

Individual
USL Championship All League First Team (3): 2016, 2017, 2022

Personal life
He is the older brother of Alex Martínez, who played for Charlotte Independence.

References

External links
 
 Discoveries Soccer Club

1990 births
Living people
Uruguayan footballers
Uruguayan expatriate footballers
North Carolina Tar Heels men's soccer players
Real Salt Lake players
North Carolina FC players
People from Rock Hill, South Carolina
Charlotte Independence players
Colorado Rapids players
Birmingham Legion FC players
Soccer players from South Carolina
Association football midfielders
Expatriate soccer players in the United States
Real Salt Lake draft picks
North American Soccer League players
USL Championship players
Major League Soccer players
All-American men's college soccer players